Portugal did not initially form part of the system of alliances involved in World War I and thus remained neutral at the start of the conflict in 1914. But even though Portugal and Germany remained officially at peace for over a year and a half after the outbreak of World War I, there were many hostile engagements between the two countries. Portugal wanted to comply with British requests for aid and protect its colonies in Africa, causing clashes with German troops in the south of Portuguese Angola, which bordered German South-West Africa, in 1914 and 1915 (see German campaign in Angola). Tensions between Germany and Portugal also arose as a result of German U-boat warfare, which sought to blockade the United Kingdom, at the time the most important market for Portuguese products. Ultimately, tensions resulted in the confiscation of German ships interned in Portuguese ports, to which Germany reacted by declaring war on 9 March 1916, quickly followed by Portugal's reciprocal declaration.

Approximately 12,000 Portuguese troops died during the course of World War I, including Africans who served in its armed forces on the colonial front. Civilian deaths in Portugal exceeded 220,000: 82,000 caused by food shortages and 138,000 by the Spanish flu.

1914

 July: The German and British Empires enter into secret negotiations over a possible dismemberment of Portuguese Angola; in such a case, most of the land would fall into the hands of the Germans. An Angola-Bund ("Angola League" to promote a German takeover) had been founded in 1912.
 August to September: Skirmishes occur between German and Portuguese colonial troops in Africa and the Germans instigate tribal revolts.
 Maziua raid (24 August): A small German force attacked a Portuguese outpost at Maziua in Mozambique, resulting in the first Portuguese casualties of World War I. The German central government accepted full responsibility, and offered an official apology.
 September: The Portuguese government sends reinforcements to the southern border of Angola. After the war breaks out, the border between German South-West Africa and Angola remains open. The Germans hope to supply food and possibly even arms through it. However, the Portuguese colonial government is hostile and tries to stop all of the trade. A few German nationals in Angola are interned.
 October: 1600 troops arrive in Portuguese Angola and 1527 troops arrive in Portuguese Mozambique from Portugal, transported by British ships.

1915
 November: 1527 troops arrive in Mozambique, commanded by Moura Mendes. The second force is tasked to recapture the Kionga Triangle from the Germans.

1916
When Portugal complies with the British request to confiscate the German ships interned in Portuguese ports, Germany reacts by declaring war on Portugal, thus forcing the Portuguese officially into the war.

 February 23: Following a British request, Portugal interns 36 German and Austro-Hungarian ships in Lisbon.
 March 9: Germany declares war on Portugal, followed by Portugal's reciprocal declaration. The Portuguese government starts to organise the participation of its troops on the Western Front. Shortly afterward, Portugal begins closing its consulates in the Ottoman Empire (for their part, the Ottomans do not have any representation in Portugal).
 March 15: Austria-Hungary declares war on Portugal.
 June 9: Finance Minister Afonso Costa participates in an Allied Economic Conference in which the Allies decide that Germany would have to return the territories of Alsace-Lorraine to France (occupied since 1871) and Kionga in Mozambique to Portugal (occupied since 1894) as a condition for peace.
 July 15: The British government formally invites Portugal to take an active part in the military operations of the Allies.
 July 22: The Portuguese Expeditionary Corps (Corpo Expedicionário Português, CEP), with 30,000 soldiers, is established in Tancos, Portugal, under the command of General Norton de Matos.
 August 7: The Portuguese Parliament accepts the participation of Portugal in the war, following the invitation of the British government. The Portuguese war effort reaches 55,000 infantry soldiers, plus 1,000 artillerymen, to be sent to France, 4,000 soldiers per month, to man 12 km of battlefront. Only the first two divisions reach France. At the same time, Portugal fields forces in its African colonies: in Mozambique to defend the colony from German colonial forces and in the south of Angola against native unrest instigated by the Germans.
 December 3: The German U-boat SM U-38, captained by Max Valentiner, enters Funchal harbour in Madeira and torpedoes and sinks 3 ships: CS Dacia,  and Surprise. The commander of the French gunboat Surprise and 34 of her crew (7 Portuguese) die in the attack. The Dacia, a British cable laying vessel, which had previously undertaken war work off the coast of Casablanca and Dakar, was in the process of diverting the German South American cable into Brest, France. Batteries on Madeira return fire and eventually force the Germans to withdraw.
 December 26: The French government asks Portugal to send artillery crews to France to operate 20 to 30 heavy artillery batteries.

1917

 A few Portuguese troops are sent to the New Forest in Britain, to help with a timber shortage in collaboration with the Canadian Forestry Corps. The stone chimney of their cookhouse is retained as a monument to them, known as the Portuguese Fireplace.
 January 3: A convention with Britain regulates Portuguese participation in the Western Front. Portuguese troops of the CEP to be integrated in the BEF (British Expeditionary Force).
 January 7: The Independent Heavy Artillery Corps (Corpo de Artilharia Pesada Independente, CAPI) is created to respond to the French request for artillery crews. Under the Portuguese Superior Command, this unit is to operate 25 heavy artillery batteries.
 February 2: The first Portuguese troops arrive at the port of Brest in Brittany, France.
 February 23: The second contingent of the CEP leaves for France.
 April 4: The Portuguese troops arrive at the front. The first Portuguese casualty is Private António Gonçalves Curado, killed in action.
 May 30: The First Infantry Brigade of the CEP First Division occupies a sector at the battle front.
 June 4: Germans attack the sector defended by the First Brigade.
 June 16: Second Infantry Brigade occupies another sector on the battle front.
 July 4: SM U-155 bombards Ponta Delgada, Azores and kills four people. United States Navy coal collier USS Orion responds with 3-inch gunfire, causing U-155 to withdraw.  
 July 10: CEP First Division assumes responsibility of its part of the Portuguese sector on the battle front. It is subordinated to the XI Corps of the British Army under the command of General Richard Haking. CEP Third Infantry Brigade occupies a sector on the front.
 September 23: The Fourth Brigade, known as the Brigade of Minho (Brigada do Minho), part of the Second Division, reaches the front.
 October 17: The first Portuguese CAPI artillery soldiers, representing Portugal's direct support to the French war effort, arrive in France. They are designated by the French as the Corps d'artillerie lourde portugais (CALP).
 November 5: Portuguese command assumes responsibility for its sector in the front. Until then, it had been under the command of General Henry Horne's British First Army.
 Late 1917: In Portuguese Mozambique, German officer Paul von Lettow-Vorbeck enters the colony from nearby German East Africa after a series of long-running battles with numerically superior British forces. 
The attack lasts around 30 min and 40  and  shells are fired. There are 3 fatalities and 17 wounded. In addition, a number of houses and Santa Clara Church are hit.
 December 17: German U-boat U-156 stops and scuttles the Portuguese ship Açoriano (a wooden three-masted schooner) southeast of the Azores.
 December 26: German U-boat U-157 (captained by Max Valentiner) sinks the Portuguese ship Lidia in the Azores.

1918

 February 17: German U-boat SM U-157 (captained by Max Valentiner) sinks the Portuguese ship Estrella de Bissao off the coast of South Africa.
 March 16: The Portuguese artillery batteries enter in action.
 March 27: A German offensive restrains the Portuguese soldiers from being released. As a third Portuguese Division is never sent to France, the Portuguese Army receives no reinforcements at all. Portuguese soldiers have to serve in the battle front for long periods and are thus among the most exhausted men in the front.
 April 6: The conditions of the Portuguese soldiers become so difficult that the British finally decide to release the Portuguese. The CEP is supposed to be reorganised, the First Division going to the rear as a reserve force and the Second Division becoming part of the Eleventh Corps of the British Army, under General Haking's command. Haking visits the Portuguese troops and decides to send the Second Division to the rear from April 9, which would never happen. The Germans attack the British lines, forcing them to retreat about 60 km. Instead of being released, the Portuguese troops have to fight off the German offensive on its sector.

 April 9: The Battle of La Lys, as it becomes known in Portugal, or Operation Georgette or the Battle of Estaires to the British, starts with a heavy artillery barrage from the Germans, followed by a German offensive with intensive use of lethal gas. The German Sixth Army deploys eight divisions (about 100,000 men), supported by intensive artillery fire. Against the force, the Portuguese have 20,000 soldiers and 88 guns. As a result, the Second Division is decimated during the battle. The Portuguese CEP loses 327 officers and 7,098 soldiers, about 35% of its effective fighting capacity. The survivors are sent to the rear, some of the units being integrated into the British Army later on. During this battle, one of the most courageous acts in Portuguese military history is perpetrated, as private Aníbal Milhais (also known as "Soldado Milhões" ["A Soldier as good as a million others" in his commanding officer's words]) defends the retreating allied forces with nothing but his machine gun, allowing them to fall back and regroup. Once he runs out of bullets, he escapes the battlefield. After defeating two German regiments and forcing the remaining German forces to go around him (they find it impossible to defeat what they believe to be an heavily armed post), he gets lost along the way, having to eat nothing but the sweet almonds his family had sent him from Portugal for three days. Lost and exhausted, he is able to rescue a British major from drowning in a swamp. The major leads him to the Allied camp and tells of Milhais's deeds.
 July: General Tomás António Garcia Rosado is appointed as the new Commanding Chief of the remaining CEP.
 July: German forces under Paul von Lettow-Vorbeck capture Namacurra in Portuguese East Africa and seize important arms and supplies for his force after similar smaller successes against Portuguese outposts had already helped reprovision his force.
 July 4: CEP First Division is subordinated to the British Fifth Army commanded by General William Birdwood.
 August 25: General Garcia Rosado assumes command of the CEP in France. The German U-boat SM U-157 sinks the Portuguese ship Gloria,  from Porto Santo, Madeira Islands.
 September 22: German U-boat SM U-157 sinks the Portuguese ship Gaia, near the Azores.
 October 14: In the action of 14 October 1918, Portuguese patrol boat NRP Augusto Castilho (commanded by Carvalho Araújo) is sunk by the German U-boat U-139 (commanded by Lothar von Arnauld de la Perière) after several hours of fighting.
 November 11: Germany accepts the armistice proposed by the Allies. The war ends.

The war causes Portugal 8,145 dead, 13,751 wounded and 12,318 prisoners or missing. At sea, 96 Portuguese ships are sunk (100,193 tons) and 5 Portuguese ships damaged (7,485 tons) by German submarines.

After the war

1919

 January 19: The Portuguese delegation at the Peace Conference in Versailles, France, is led by Professor Egas Moniz. In the Treaty of Versailles, Germany cedes the port of Kionga, associated with German East Africa (now mainland Tanzania), to Portugal. This is the only territorial gain acquired by Portugal for its participation in World War I on the side of the victorious Allies.

1921

 November 19: Charles I, the last emperor of the Austro-Hungarian Empire, goes into exile on the Portuguese island of Madeira, where he remains until his death on April 1, 1922. In 1917, he had tried to enter secretly peace negotiations with France.  Although his foreign minister Ottokar Czernin was interested in negotiating only a general peace that would include Germany as well, Charles himself, in negotiations with the French with his brother-in-law Prince Sixtus of Bourbon-Parma, an officer in the Belgian army, as an intermediary, went much farther in suggesting his willingness to make a separate peace. When news of the overture leaked in April 1918, Charles denied involvement until French Prime Minister Georges Clemenceau published letters signed by Charles. That led to Czernin's resignation and forced Austria-Hungary into an even more dependent position with respect to its German ally. Determined to prevent a restoration attempt, the Council of Allied Powers agreed on Madeira as a place of exile for the former emperor because it was isolated in the Atlantic and easily guarded.

See also 

 Portugal during World War II

References

Works cited 

Portugal in World War I
World War I